Paratilapia polleni is a medium-sized cichlid endemic to Madagascar. It is also a popular fish for display at public aquaria.

It is sometimes referred to by the common names polleni cichlid and black diamond cichlid, while the name marakely (black fish) is used among locals in Madagascar.  This species is probably the only known member of its genus, as its current congener, P. toddi, from the African mainland, is unlikely to belong to this genus. Its specific name honours François Pollen (1842-1888), a Dutch naturalist and merchant, who collected the type when visiting Madagascar with fellow Dutch naturalist and explorer Douwe Casparus van Dam (1827-1898).

Morphology 
P. polleni is a laterally compressed, full-bodied fish. Like most cichlids, it resembles a perch-type fish in shape, hence the taxonomic designation perciformes - 'perch-like'. Males in captivity develop a nuchal hump, a layer of fat above the eyes, though not to the same degree as other similar African cichlids, such as Cyphotilapia frontosa,  and tilapias of Africa.

Adult and subadult dominant P. polleni individuals are jet black in color, covered with brilliant iridescent spots which shift from golden to blue depending on the movement of the fish and the angle of the light; the eye is a bright yellow. The male  can reach almost  in total length;  females are usually half that length. Sexing individuals thus becomes easier as they mature. In addition, males tend to have longer and sharper pelvic fins, a more rounded head shape, and the edges of the dorsal and anal fins are often straighter in males, and more rounded in females. Among aquarists, females, though smaller, are said to be more beautiful in their coloration patterning.

In the USA a few years ago, a tropical fish wholesaler from New Jersey was maintaining both 'spot' variations, which gave him an opportunity to observe them side by side. He noticed a distinct difference in behavior, size, and fright coloration, which made him certain that rather than being the same species, the fishes might well be two different ones. As a result of following scientific investigation to determine anatomical differences, the small-spot variant was established as  the species originally described as Paratilapia polleni Bleeker, 1898, and that the large-spot variant was a distinct species.

The name Paratilapia bleekeri Sauvage, 1882, (honoring Bleeker, who described P. polleni), was revived and applied to the latter form. P. bleekeri is a larger fish than P. polleni, and can reach 30 cm when fully mature, with males larger than females.

 Habitat and behavior 
In the wild, P. polleni is a very adaptable cichlid. It can be found at altitudes  up to 1500 m with water temperatures of 12°C and in hot springs which can reach 40°C. It inhabits a number of rivers and associated streams in northern Madagascar, including the environs of the town of Andapa, where most individuals exported for the aquarium trade in recent years were collected. It is an omnivorous fish and occasional opportunistic piscivore, approaching smaller unsuspecting fish by stealth, with their dark coloration giving them an advantage. P. polleni observed hunting in the aquarium environment will sneak up on smaller fish from below during the predawn hours and suck the smaller fish into its mouth using the typical cichlid 'suction effect' caused by quickly opening its mouth. Thus, using stealth and crypsis, it is able to prey on fish it would otherwise not be able to catch. In Madagascar, P. polleni is a food fish, and like many cichlid fishes in many regions, is reputed to have a good flavor.

References

Further reading
 Nourissat, J. C., and P. de Rham. 2004. The Endemic Cichlids of Madagascar.'' Association France Cichlid.

External links
 Biolib
 Paratilapia polleni - Cichlid Room. Accessed on 15 February 2008.

Paratilapia
Freshwater fish of Madagascar
Fish described in 1868